Ludwig Munzinger (1877-1957) was the founder of the German encyclopedia Munzinger-Archiv. Following his death, his son Ludwig Munzinger Jr. took over the running of the organization.

References

1877 births
1957 deaths